Middle Hill is a hill in the Manor Hills range, part of the Southern Uplands of Scotland. It is often climbed from Drumelzier to the north or Stanhope Farm to the west, but ascents from the Manor Valley to the east are also possible.

Subsidiary SMC Summits

References

Mountains and hills of the Southern Uplands
Mountains and hills of the Scottish Borders
Donald mountains